German submarine U-1225 was a Type IXC/40 U-boat of Nazi Germany's Kriegsmarine during World War II.

The submarine was laid down on 28 December 1942 at the Deutsche Werft yard at Hamburg, launched on 21 July 1943, and commissioned on 10 November 1943 under the command of Oberleutnant zur See Ernst Sauerberg. The U-boat then served with 31st U-boat Flotilla, a training unit, until 31 May 1944. She was then transferred to the 2nd U-boat Flotilla for active service.

Design
German Type IXC/40 submarines were slightly larger than the original Type IXCs. U-1225 had a displacement of  when at the surface and  while submerged. She had two shafts and two  propellers.

U-1225 was fitted with six  torpedo tubes (four fitted at the bow and two at the stern), 22 torpedoes, one  SK C/32 naval gun, 180 rounds, and a  Flak M42 as well as two twin  C/30 anti-aircraft guns. The boat had a complement of forty-eight.

Service history

U-1225 had a short but active career. She departed Kristiansand on 20 June 1944, never to return. Four days out of port, the new submarine was attacked by Canso aircraft of No. 162 Squadron RCAF. The flying boat was shot down, but not before her depth charges fatally wounded the U-boat. All 56 sailors went down with the sub. Three of the eight aircrew from the Catalina were lost as well. The pilot, David Ernest Hornell, was awarded a posthumous Victoria Cross.

References

Bibliography

External links

Ships built in Hamburg
German Type IX submarines
U-boats commissioned in 1943
World War II submarines of Germany
1943 ships
U-boats sunk in 1944
U-boats sunk by depth charges
U-boats sunk by Canadian aircraft
World War II shipwrecks in the Norwegian Sea
Maritime incidents in June 1944